The René Huguenin Hospital is a renowned teaching hospital in Saint-Cloud. Part of the Curie Institute and a teaching hospital of Versailles Saint-Quentin-en-Yvelines University.

Established in 2010, it was named in honour of René Huguenin, Professor of Pathology and Director of the Institut Gustave Roussy.

References

External links
 René Huguenin Hospital

Hospitals in Île-de-France
Hospital buildings completed in 2010
Teaching hospitals in France
Buildings and structures in Île-de-France
2010 establishments in France
21st-century architecture in France